The Invisible Collection is a 2012 Brazilian drama film, directed by Bernard Attal and starring Vladimir Brichta, Walmor Chagas and Ludmila Rosa. It was shot in Salvador and Itajuípe, Bahia.

Plot 
Beto's family owns a traditional antique store that is going through a financial crisis. To try to solve the situation, he travels to the town of Itajuípe, Bahia, in search of a rare collection of engravings which was acquired 30 years ago by a former client, the collector Samir. However, shortly upon arriving Beto faces strong resistance from his wife and his daughter Saada.
Based on the short story by Stefan Zweig.

Cast 
 Vladimir Brichta as Beto
 Walmor Chagas as Samir
 Ludmila Rosa as Saada
 Clarisse Abujamra as Dona Clara
 Wesley Macedo as Wesley
 Frank Menezes as Nemias
 Conceicão Senna as Dona Iolanda
 Paulo César Pereio as Radio Host

Festivals and awards
 Gramado Film Festival: Audience award for Best Film, Best Supporting Actor (Walmor Chagas), Best Supporting Actress (Clarisse Abujamra)
 Bogota International Film Festival: Best Feature Film (ex aequo with Florbela)
 Fest-In Lisboa: Best Feature Film
 Chicago International Film Festival
 International Film Festival of Mannheim-Heidelberg
 Rio International Film Festival
 Mostra Internacional de São Paulo
 Havana Film Festival
 Films By the Sea

See also
 Stefan Zweig

References

External links
  
 

2012 films
2012 drama films
Brazilian drama films
Films shot in Salvador, Bahia
2012 directorial debut films